John Warwick (fl. 1406) was an English politician.

He was a Member (MP) of the Parliament of England for Totnes in 1406.

References

Year of birth missing
Year of death missing
English MPs 1406
Members of the Parliament of England (pre-1707) for Totnes